...Make You Breathe is the debut album by Swedish rock band Takida. It was recorded at Sidelake Studios in Sundsvall, Sweden.

Track listing

References 

Takida albums
2006 debut albums
Ninetone Records albums